The GAA Hurling Intermediate All-Ireland Championship, known simply as the All-Ireland Intermediate Championship, is an annual inter-county hurling competition organised by the Gaelic Athletic Association (GAA). Effectively contested by the second string teams of the top inter-county hurling sides in Ireland, the tournament has taken place every year since 1997—having originally been run between 1961 and 1973.

The final, currently held in July, serves as the culmination of a series of games played during the early summer, and the results determine which team receives the Michael Cusack Cup. The All-Ireland Championship has always been played on a straight knockout basis whereby once a team loses they are eliminated from the championship, however, the qualification procedures for the championship have changed several times throughout its history. Currently, qualification is limited to teams competing in the Leinster Championship and the Munster Championship.

Only two teams currently participate in the All-Ireland Championship, with the most successful teams coming from the province of Munster. Teams representing this province have won a total of 17 All-Ireland titles.

The title has been won by 11 different teams, 6 of whom have won the title more than once. The all-time record-holders are Cork, who have each won the championship on 9 occasions. Cork are the current champions.

The future of the All-Ireland Championship is currently uncertain, as Cork and Kilkenny are the only two counties to have shown an interest in fielding teams in the 2018 championship.

History

Creation

The Commission for the Improvement and Spread of Hurling had suggested the introduction of a new grade to improve the standard of hurling. It was also hoped that a new grade would prove successful in bridging the gap between the junior  and senior grades. At the GAA's annual Congress in April 1960, the All-Ireland Intermediate Hurling Championship won the approval of the delegates. It was the fourth All-Ireland championship to be created after the corresponding championships in senior (1887), junior (1912) and minor (1928).

Beginnings

The inaugural All-Ireland Championship in 1961 used a provincial format, with teams contesting the respective championships in Leinster and Munster. Galway continued with their policy of competing in the Munster Championship in all grades, while Antrim, a team who faced little competition in Ulster, competed in the Leinster Championship.

Dublin and Antrim contested the very first championship match on Sunday 2 April 1961 at Croke Park, Dublin. The inaugural All-Ireland final took place on 17 September 1961, with Wexford defeating London to take the title.

Format

The first five All-Ireland Championships featured the Leinster and Munster champions contesting the All-Ireland home final, with the winners of that game facing London in the All-Ireland final proper. Semi-finals were introduced in 1966 as the respective champions from Connacht and Ulster entered the All-Ireland series for the first time. After winning the All-Ireland title for the second year in succession, London left the intermediate grade in 1969. Because of this, the All-Ireland series was reduced to two semi-finals and a final.

In 1970, Galway became the sole representatives of Connacht and gained automatic entry to the All-Ireland semi-finals. The format of facing a British team in the All-Ireland final returned with the entry of Warwickshire to the All-Ireland series.

Following the conclusion of the 1973 championship, the All-Ireland Championship was disbanded and replaced with the All-Ireland Senior B Hurling Championship.

At the GAA Congress in 1996, the All-Ireland Championship was reintroduced.

Format

Qualification

Championship

Due to the fact that only two teams compete in the championship, the respective provincial champions contest the final. The final is played as a single leg.

Trophy and medals

At the end of the All-Ireland final, the winning team is presented with a trophy. The cup is held by the winning team until the following year's final. Traditionally, the presentation is made at a special rostrum in stand where GAA and political dignitaries and special guests view the match.

The cup is decorated with ribbons in the colours of the winning team. During the game the cup actually has both teams' sets of ribbons attached and the runners-up ribbons are removed before the presentation. The winning captain accepts the cup on behalf of his team before giving a short speech. Individual members of the winning team then have an opportunity to come to the rostrum to lift the cup. The cup is named in honour of Michael Cusack.

In accordance with GAA rules, the Central Council awards up to twenty-four gold medals to the winners of the All-Ireland final.

Results

Summaries

Performances by counties

References

All-Ireland inter-county hurling championships